Lopharcha angustior is a moth of the family Tortricidae. It is found in eastern Java and Taiwan.

References

Moths described in 1941
Lopharcha